Wentworth was a British cargo steamer that was hit by a torpedo fired by the  while travelling as part of a convoy in the North Atlantic in 1943. Five crewmen died. The ship was so damaged that  attempted to scuttle it soon after.

Construction
The Wentworth was built by Richardson, Duck & Company of Stockton on Tees in 1919. She was originally named the War Phlox.

Sinking
In April 1943, Wentworth, under the command of Reginald Gilbert Phillips, joined Convoy ONS 5 (outward, northbound, slow) from Britain to North America. The convoy was made up of 42 ships, of which 12 or 13 were sunk after the convoy came under sustained attack from German submarines hunting in packs.
In the early morning of 5 May, Wentworth was south of Greenland and east of Newfoundland when it was hit by a torpedo fired by a U-boat, under the command of Rolf Manke. Manke had sunk Bristol City not long before. The torpedo hit Wentworth on its port side, creating a hole in the hull that allowed the sea into the engine and boiler rooms. Four men in the engine room died immediately and another later drowned. The order was given to abandon ship and most of the crew left in three lifeboats. Phillips and a few others remained until 03:50 when the ship began to break apart, after which they left in one of the remaining lifeboats. About two hours later,  arrived and the decision was taken to try to scuttle the Wentworth but that was unsuccessful. The survivors from both ships were picked up by Loosestrife and landed at St Johns in Newfoundland.

References

External links
 SS Wentworth [+1943]. wrecksite.eu
 Details of Reginald Gilbert Phillips discharge

1919 ships
Merchant ships of the United Kingdom
Ships sunk by German submarines in World War II
Maritime incidents in April 1943